Adrian J. Bailey is a scholar known for his research in population, migration, economic, and social geography. He is currently Chair Professor of Geography and Dean of Social Sciences at Hong Kong Baptist University. His research interests include the study of transnationalism, with his work in this area exploring the diverse ways in which the state affects life outcomes among immigrants and refugees.

Bailey holds a PhD from Indiana University (Geography with a Minor in African Population Studies). He has previously worked at the University of Leeds and Dartmouth College.

Honours 
In 2013, the Academy of Social Sciences bestowed the status of Academician on Bailey, in recognition of the impact of his work on the social sciences. This title was later changed to Fellow by the Academy.

In 1989, Bailey received the Lieber Memorial Teaching Associate Award from Indiana University, which was established to recognise outstanding teachers among the university's graduate students.

Works

Books 
 Bailey, A. J. (2005). Making population geography. London: Oxford University Press. Summarizes the inception, evolution and possible futures of the field of population geography.

Selected articles 
 Bailey, A. J. (2013). Migration, recession and an emerging transnational biopolitics across Europe. Geoforum, 44, 202-210. doi:10.1016/j.geoforum.2012.09.006
 Bailey, A. J. (2009). Population geography: Lifecourse matters. Progress in Human Geography, 33(3), 407-418. doi:10.1177/0309132508096355
 Bailey, A. J., Wright, R. A., Mountz, A. & Miyares, I. M. (2002). (Re)producing Salvadoran Transnational Geographies. Annals of the Association of American Geographers, 92(1), 125-144. doi:10.1111/1467-8306.00283

Editorships 
 Transactions of the Institute of British Geographers. Term began 1 January 2016.

References

External links 
 HKBU Department of Geography profile
 Google Scholar profile



Geographers
Fellows of the Academy of Social Sciences
Year of birth missing (living people)
Living people